Sergey Sergeyevich Lomanov (born 2 June 1980 in Krasnoyarsk) is a Russian bandy player (forward), currently playing for Yenisey. He has been team captain of Russia, but during the 2018–19 season declined to continue with the national team.

He is the son of Sergey Ivanovich Lomanov.

In 2016 he was part of the delegation received by President Vladimir Putin and was also selected as the best Russian Bandy Super League player for the fourth year in a row.

At the Opening Ceremony of the 2019 Winter Universiade he lit the fire, together with former gymnast Svetlana Khorkina.

Career
Lomanov started his career in Yenisey and made his senior debut in 1997. In 2005, he joined Dynamo Moscow, where he played for three seasons before returning to Yenisey in 2008. In 2016 he signed for IFK Vänersborg. As he partly grew up in Sweden, when his father was playing for IK Sirius, he now speaks fluent Swedish.

References

External links
 
 

1980 births
Living people
Russian bandy players
Yenisey Krasnoyarsk players
Dynamo Moscow players
Expatriate bandy players in Sweden
IFK Vänersborg players
Russian Bandy Super League players
Elitserien (bandy) players
Bandy World Championship-winning players